In the mathematical study of the differential geometry of surfaces, a tangent developable is a particular kind of developable surface obtained from a curve in Euclidean space as the surface swept out by the tangent lines to the curve.  Such a surface is also the envelope of the tangent planes to the curve.

Parameterization
Let  be a parameterization of a smooth space curve.

The original curve forms a boundary of the tangent developable, and is called its directrix or edge of regression.  This curve is obtained by first developing the surface into the plane, and then considering the image in the plane of the generators of the ruling on the surface.  The envelope of this family of lines is a plane curve whose inverse image under the development is the edge of regression.  Intuitively, it is a curve along which the surface needs to be folded during the process of developing into the plane.

Properties

The tangent developable is a developable surface; that is, it is a surface with zero Gaussian curvature. It is one of three fundamental types of developable surface; the other two are the generalized cones (the surface traced out by a one-dimensional family of lines through a fixed point), and the cylinders (surfaces traced out by a one-dimensional family of parallel lines). (The plane is sometimes given as a fourth type, or may be seen as a special case of either of these two types.) Every developable surface in three-dimensional space may be formed by gluing together pieces of these three types; it follows from this that every developable surface is a ruled surface, a union of a one-dimensional family of lines. However, not every ruled surface is developable; the helicoid provides a counterexample.

The tangent developable of a curve containing a point of zero torsion will contain a self-intersection.

History
Tangent developables were first studied by Leonhard Euler in 1772. Until that time, the only known developable surfaces were the generalized cones and the cylinders. Euler showed that tangent developables are developable and that  every developable surface is of one of these types.

Notes

References 

.

External links

Differential geometry of surfaces